Sinfra Department is a department of Marahoué Region in Sassandra-Marahoué District, Ivory Coast. In 2021, its population was 245,226 and its seat is the settlement of Sinfra. The sub-prefectures of the department are Bazré, Kononfla, Kouétinfla, and Sinfra.

History
Sinfra Department was created in 1988 as a first-level subdivision via a split-off from Bouaflé Department.

In 1997, regions were introduced as new first-level subdivisions of Ivory Coast; as a result, all departments were converted into second-level subdivisions. Sinfra Department was included in Marahoué Region.

In 2011, districts were introduced as new first-level subdivisions of Ivory Coast. At the same time, regions were reorganised and became second-level subdivisions and all departments were converted into third-level subdivisions. At this time, Sinfra Department remained part of the retained Marahoué Region in the new Sassandra-Marahoué District.

Notes

Departments of Marahoué
1988 establishments in Ivory Coast
States and territories established in 1988